The Bounty shag (Leucocarbo ranfurlyi), also known as the Bounty Island shag, is a species of cormorant of the family Phalacrocoracidae. They are found only on the tiny and remote Subantarctic Bounty Islands, 670 km southeast of New Zealand.  Its natural habitats are open seas and rocky shores. In 2005 618 individuals were counted (with roughly 410 mature ones) and the population seems to have remained stable since.

Some taxonomic authorities, including the International Ornithologists' Union, place this species in the genus Leucocarbo. Others place it in the genus Phalacrocorax.

Description
Size; 71 cm. Large, black-and-white cormorant. Black head, hind neck, lower back, rump, uppertail-coverts, all with metallic blue sheen. White underparts. Pink feet. White patches on wings appear as bar when folded. Caruncles absent. Voice: Male makes call during displays only.

IUCN classifies this species as Vulnerable because its very small population and breeding range renders it susceptible to stochastic events and human impacts. The Bounty Islands are a nature reserve and are free of introduced predators. In 1998, they were declared part of a UNESCO World Heritage Site. The islands are uninhabited and are seldom visited, so human interference is minimal.

References

External links
Species factsheet - BirdLife International

Bounty shag
Birds of the Bounty Islands
Bounty shag
Taxonomy articles created by Polbot
Endemic birds of New Zealand